Eugene "Gene" Watts is an American-Canadian trombonist and a founding member of the Canadian Brass, a brass quintet based in Canada.

Early life and education 
Watts was born and raised in Sedalia, Missouri, and studied at the University of Missouri School of Music and New England Conservatory of Music.

Career 
Watts worked as an orchestral trombonist for several American orchestras. He was hand-picked by conductor Seiji Ozawa as principal trombonist for the Toronto Symphony, where he met Charles Daellenbach, and persuaded him to start the Canadian Brass in 1970.

In 2010, he retired from touring, and is now listed as an "Emeritus" member of the Canadian Brass. He currently resides in Toronto. He is a teacher (emeritus) of the Transcendental Meditation program, having been trained in India personally by Maharishi Mahesh Yogi.

References

Living people
Musicians from Missouri
American expatriates in Canada
20th-century American musicians
21st-century American musicians
20th-century Canadian male musicians
21st-century Canadian male musicians
American trombonists
Male trombonists
Canadian trombonists
Musicians from Toronto
21st-century trombonists
20th-century trombonists
University of Missouri alumni
University of Missouri School of Music alumni
20th-century American male musicians
21st-century American male musicians
Year of birth missing (living people)